After the Battle (translit. Baad el Mawkeaa) is a 2012 Egyptian-French drama film written by Omar Shama and directed by Yousry Nasrallah. The film competed for the Palme d'Or at the 2012 Cannes Film Festival.

Plot 
The film takes place in Egypt during the Arab Spring.

Cast
 Menna Shalabi as Reem
 Nahed El Sebaï as Fatma
 Bassem Samra as Mahmoud
 Salah Abdullah as Haj Abdallah
 Phaedra as Dina
 Abdallah Medhat as Abdallah
 Momen Medhat as Momen
 Ahmed Kotb as David
 Ahmed Salama
 Abdelrahman Yasser as Basel

References

External links

 

2012 films
2012 drama films
Egyptian drama films
2010s Arabic-language films
Films directed by Yousry Nasrallah
France 3 Cinéma films